Yanzigang Stadium is a multi-purpose stadium in Guangzhou, Guangdong, China. It mainly used for campus football league and youth football championships of Guangzhou. It is the current home of Hong Kong Premier League club R&F as well as the Guangzhou Evergrande Reserves.

History
Yanzigang Stadium was opened in September 1985 as the training field for football in the 1987 National Games of China. It also served as a training field for the 1991 FIFA Women's World Cup, 2001 National Games of China and 2010 Asian Games. It was the home stadium of Guangzhou Evergrande youth team for the 2011 China League Two.

Guangzhou Evergrande Reserves moved their home stadium from Lishui Evergrande Training Base to Yanzigang Stadium in 2017. In June, Hong Kong Premier League club R&F received approval to use Yanzigang as their home stadium.

Facilities
The stadium is situated on a 60,207m² complex which includes a 400m track, one 5 a side football pitch, one 7 a side football pitches, one natural grass and one artificial regulation size pitches. In addition, there are tennis courts, table tennis courts, six indoor badminton courts and a basketball court.

References

Football venues in Guangzhou
Haizhu District
Multi-purpose stadiums in China
Sports venues in Guangzhou
Sports venues completed in 1985
1985 establishments in China